Andre Begemann and Alexander Kudryavtsev were the defending champions but Kudryavtsev decided not to participate.
Begemann played alongside Martin Emmrich.
James Cerretani and Adil Shamasdin won the title, defeating Tomasz Bednarek and Andreas Siljeström 6–3, 2–6, [10–4] in the final.

Seeds

Draw

Draw

References
 Main Draw

Bauer Watertechnology Cup - Doubles
2012 Doubles